The following is a list of the 163 communes of the Alpes-Maritimes department of France.

The communes cooperate in the following intercommunalities (as of 2020):
Métropole Nice Côte d'Azur
Communauté d'agglomération Cannes Pays de Lérins
Communauté d'agglomération du Pays de Grasse
Communauté d'agglomération de la Riviera Française
Communauté d'agglomération de Sophia Antipolis
Communauté de communes Alpes d'Azur
Communauté de communes du Pays des Paillons

References

Alpes-Maritimes